Sarah Gillett  (born 21 July 1956) is a British former diplomat who was British Ambassador to Norway from July 2014 to 2018. She previously served as Ambassador to Switzerland and Liechtenstein from 2009 to 2013.

Early life 
Gillett is the daughter of diplomat Sir Michael Gillett.

She was educated at St Antony's School, near Sherborne, Dorset (now Leweston School), and Aberdeen University.

Career
She joined the Diplomatic Service in 1976 and served at Washington, D.C., Paris, Los Angeles, Brasilia, Montreal and at the Foreign and Commonwealth Office (FCO). She was Vice-Marshal of the Diplomatic Corps and Director of Protocol at the FCO 2006–09, and Ambassador to Switzerland and concurrently to Liechtenstein 2009–13. She was Ambassador to Norway from August 2014 to summer 2018.

Honours
Gillett was appointed MVO in 1986, CMG in the 2009 Birthday Honours and raised to CVO in December 2009 at the end of her appointment as Vice-Marshal of the Diplomatic Corps.

References

1956 births
Living people
British women ambassadors
People educated at Leweston School
Alumni of the University of Aberdeen
Members of HM Diplomatic Service
Ambassadors of the United Kingdom to Switzerland
Ambassadors of the United Kingdom to Liechtenstein
Ambassadors of the United Kingdom to Norway
Companions of the Order of St Michael and St George
Commanders of the Royal Victorian Order
20th-century British diplomats